Dubrajpur Assembly constituency is an assembly constituency in Birbhum district in the Indian state of West Bengal. It is reserved for scheduled castes.

Overview
As per orders of the Delimitation Commission, No. 284, Dubrajpur Assembly constituency (SC) is composed of the following: Dubrajpur municipality,  Balijuri, Hetampur, Jashpur, Laxmi Narayanpur, Loba and Paduma gram panchayats of Dubrajpur CD Block, and Khoyrasol CD Block.

Dubrajpur Assembly constituency is part of No. 42 Birbhum (Lok Sabha constituency). It was earlier part of Bolpur (Lok Sabha constituency).

Members of Legislative Assembly

Election results

2021

2016

In the 2016 elections, Naresh Chandra Bauri of AITC defeated his nearest rival, Bijoy Bagdi of AIFB.

2011
In the 2011 elections, Bijoy Bagdi of AIFB defeated his nearest rival Santoshi Saha of Trinamool Congress.

 

.# Swing calculated on Congress+Trinamool Congress vote percentages taken together in 2006.

1977-2006
In the 2006 and 2001 state assembly elections Bhakti Pada Ghosh of Forward Bloc won the Dubrajpur assembly seat defeating his nearests Sailen Mahata and Sattick Roy, both of Trinamool Congress respectively. Contests in most years were multi cornered but only winners and runners are being mentioned. Bhakti Bhushan Mandal of Forward Bloc won the seat from 1977 to 1996, defeating Arun Kumar Chakraborty of Congress In 1996, Bishnu Charan Ghosh of Congress in 1991, Gourhari Chandra of Congress in 1987, Nitaipada Ghosh of Congress in 1987 and Enayet Karim Choudhury of Congress in 1977.

1962–1972
Sachi Nandan Swami of Congress won in 1972. Manjurul Islam of CPI(M) won in 1971. Bhakti Bhushan Mandal of Forward Bloc won in 1969. K.N.Bandopadhyay, Independent, won in 1967. Bhakti Bhushan Mandal of Forward Bloc won in 1962. Prior to that the Dubrajpur seat was not there.

References

Assembly constituencies of West Bengal
Politics of Birbhum district